Martin Young (born 9 April 1955) is an English former professional footballer who played as a defender.

References

1955 births
Living people
Footballers from Grimsby
English footballers
Association football defenders
Grimsby Town F.C. players
English Football League players